Kornelius Normann Hansen (born 6 May 2001) is a Norwegian footballer who plays as a midfielder for Dutch club Almere City.

Career

Club
On 25 May 2020, Normann Hansen signed for Stabæk Fotball on a contract until the 2022 season, from Southampton Academy, where he had spent three years. He soon made his mark by scoring both goals in the 2–0 win against Strømsgodset, as well as the winning goal in the 2–1 match against Kristiansund.

On 10 January 2023, he moved to the Netherlands to join Eerste Divisie club Almere City on a two-and-a-half year deal.

Personal life
He is a brother of Kristoffer Normann Hansen.

Career statistics

Club

References

2001 births
Living people
People from Larvik
Sportspeople from Vestfold og Telemark
Norwegian footballers
Norwegian expatriate footballers
Norway youth international footballers
Association football midfielders
Larvik Turn players
Strømsgodset Toppfotball players
IF Fram Larvik players
Southampton F.C. players
Stabæk Fotball players
Almere City FC players
Eliteserien players
Norwegian First Division players
Eerste Divisie players
Norwegian expatriate sportspeople in England
Norwegian expatriate sportspeople in the Netherlands
Expatriate footballers in England
Expatriate footballers in the Netherlands